Swaminathan Gurumurthy is a Rashtriya Swayamsevak Sangh (RSS) Ideologue. He is also a journalist editing the Tamil political weekly Thuglak and a Chartered Accountant. He is also the editor of Rajasthan Patrika.

He is the co-convenor of the RSS affiliate Swadeshi Jagaran Manch.

Personal life
He was born to a Vadama Tamil Brahmin family at South Arcot District (Madras Presidency).

Activism 
He is considered to be a Hindu nationalist ideologue; he has mentioned that he is not into electoral politics based on inputs from Swami Chandrasekharendra Saraswati.

He exposed the aggressive corporate expansion by Dhirubhai Ambani and believed Ambani's business practices were unhealthy for the nation. Goenka entrusted Gurumurthy with fighting and exposing Reliance Industries. Gurumurthy's articles in The Indian Express created stirs in the corporate world as they publicly denounced a culture of corruption within the troubled conglomerate. India Today magazine ranked him 30th in India's 50 most powerful people of 2017 list.

He has written articles in The New Indian Express highlighting the disadvantages of globalization. His articles espoused the mission of the Swadeshi Jagran Manch and the RSS as well as an uncompromising commitment to the unity of India.

He was the subject of media coverage when he publicly accused two then-senior Indian bureaucrats of being American moles. He indirectly named them in the New Indian Express article titled, "US plots Gujral-Sharif show" dated 20-09-1997. Later, in his article "Not one mole, Mr Prime Minister and Mr Jaswant, but Two!" dated 27-07-2006, he explicitly named Dr. V S Arunachalam and Naresh Chandra Saxena as the two moles.

Gurumurthy has been a regular columnist at The New Indian Express.

Politics 
Gurumurthy has never contested any election. In the 2014 General Election another person, a namesake of Gurumurthy who spelled his name differently ("S Gurumoorthy") was chosen by the Bharatiya Janata Party as its candidate in the Nilgiris parliamentary constituency in Tamil Nadu. Gurumurthy denied that he was the candidate in Nilgiris through tweets and interviews. The 4 September 2014 issue of The Hindu carried a news item titled, "Baffled by the unexpected spotlight," in which it said "First his friends called to congratulate him for contesting from Nilgiris Lok Sabha Constituency. Even as he explained that he was not in the fray, another round of calls came on Monday from many who wondered why his nomination papers were rejected. Gurumurthy, Chartered Accountant and columnist, was baffled when his photo was flashed in some television channels which claimed that he was the BJP's candidate in the Nilgiris constituency."  The New Indian Express on 8 April 2014 published a clarification, "1 Name, 2 Persons, Too Many Queries", for various news channel's faux pas in mentioning chartered accountant, S Gurumurthy as the candidate who was disqualified from Nilgiris.

Influence on the AIADMK 
Gurumurthy in December 2017, in a tweet called Chief Miniser K Palaniswami and Deputy Chief Minister O. Panneerselvam as "impotent leaders" for their action against the supporters of TTV Dhinakaran, when AIADMK lost the RK Nagar Polls. Later he said had used the term, "impotent," in a political context. Tamil Nadu Fisheries Minister D Jayakumar said he would take legal action against Gurumurthy, if necessary, for his grossly offensive views.

Gurumurthy fuelled a controversy in November 2019 when he claimed in a speech that he was the one who ignited revolt in the AIADMK party, which prompted Tamil Nadu Deputy Chief Minister O Panneerselvam to carry out 'dharmayudham' (a war for justice) after Jayalalitha's death in 2017. Gurumurthy's also revealed that he told O. Pannerselvam that he was not "man enough" to take on the V.K Sasikala's faction after Jayalalithaa's death. He continued to criticize the ruling government of AIADMK, calling it "a gang of robbers. This received him criticism from the AIADMK. Later he clarified that he only said that why the AIADMK workers were so spineless for prostrating at Sasikala's feet. This created yet another round of criticisms.

Rajinikanth's politics
Gurumurthy was also known as Rajinikanth's 'advisor', has been known to be as someone who pushed for Rajinikanth to join politics. A political analyst said, "It was Gurumurthy who wanted Rajinikanth in politics more than Rajinikanth himself. The long term plan was to make way for a non Dravidian party option and create a vote bank for BJP." After Rajinikanth announced that he would not be joining politics due to health complications, Gurumurthy said that Rajinikanth would still make a 'political impact' in the 2021 Tamil Nadu Assembly elections.

In the media 
Gurumurthy created a controversy when he said that only 30% of the women are feminine in India during a speech at a hospital in Chennai in August 2019. He also said that femininity has diminished in the present day women and the number of feminine women in India has decreased and women who are not feminine have become more. He also said women in femininity are like deities and he cannot accept women who are not feminine as deities. The speech received wide range of criticism. The All India Democratic Women's Association protested in Puliyakulam against him for his comments on women.

Gurumurthy used the Tamil phrase "Kazhisadai" to refer to government bank staff in a derogatory manner at Thuglak magazine's anniversary event in Chennai in May 2022. His remarks drew criticism from a number of leaders of opposition, bank officials and bank unions including the RBI employees union. The All India Bank Employees Association (AIBEA) called for his dismissal from the board in RBI.

References

Living people
Indian accountants
s.,Gurumurthy
Year of birth missing (living people)
Reserve Bank of India

Shri S Gurumurthy is a part of the selection jury in Mahaveer Awards presented by Bhagwan Mahaveer Awards.